Voom:Voom is an Austrian electronica group consisting of Christian Prommer, Roland Appel (of the groups Fauna Flash and Trüby Trio) and Peter Kruder of Kruder & Dorfmeister.

Their first full-length album, PengPeng, was released on April 24, 2006, on Studio !K7 records.  They had previously released four EPs.

External links 
 Official site with samples
discogs.com discography

Austrian electronic music groups
Compost Records artists
Techno music groups